Zabeel Park is an urban public park located in the Zabeel district of Dubai, United Arab Emirates. It is bounded by Sheikh Rashid Road to the north, the Sheikh Khalifa bin Zayed Road to the northwest, while the Sheikh Zayed Road cuts through the south. The park is divided into numerous sectors connected by pedestrian bridges, and there are multiple entrance gates. The Dubai Frame is located inside the park.

Situated between Al Karama and the Dubai World Trade Centre, Zabeel Park covers much of the Al Kifaf area. It is accessible from the Red Line of Dubai Metro via the nearby Al Jafiliya Station. It is maintained by the Public Parks and Horticulture Department of Dubai Municipality.

Background
The park was opened to the public in December 2005, in an inauguration ceremony by Sheikh Hamdan bin Rashid Al Maktoum. The size of Zabeel Park is 47.5 ha (117.375 acres), or about 45 football fields. The parking capacity can accommodate 2,300 vehicles.

Activities
The entrance fee is AED 5 per person. The park is one of the city's largest and most frequented, and is a popular spot for sports and live music. It contains various recreational facilities including a 2.5 km jogging track on the park perimeter, pedestrian tracks, BMX track, skateboarding park, barbecue and picnic areas, a boating lake, lakeside restaurants, ice skating, a mini cricket pitch and golfing area, shaded seating and children's play areas. There is also an exhibition gallery, prayer rooms, a fitness centre, and various monuments. The park has a technology-based theme, with three zones (the Alternative Energy Zone, Communications Zone and the Techno Zone) containing educational and interactive displays. It also offers a 3D cinema for edutainment activities.

There are over 3,000 palm tree plantations in the park, in addition to 7,000 other trees of a variety of 14 species. Visitors have access to Wi-Fi internet. During the 20th Dubai Shopping Festival in 2015, the park attracted over 90,000 visitors in the first 10 days.

Photo gallery

See also

 List of parks in Dubai

References

External links
 Zabeel Park at Dubai Municipality 

2005 establishments in the United Arab Emirates
Parks in Dubai
Urban public parks